Lotu Inisi (born 26 April 1999 in Tonga) is a Tongan rugby union player who plays for  in Super Rugby. His playing position is flanker. He was named in the Moana Pasifika squad for the 2022 Super Rugby Pacific season. He also represented  in the 2021 Bunnings NPC.

Reference list

External links
itsrugby.co.uk profile

1999 births
Tongan rugby union players
Living people
Rugby union flankers
North Harbour rugby union players
Moana Pasifika players
Tonga international rugby union players